Tahani Rached is a Canadian-Egyptian documentary filmmaker. She is best known for her work Four Women of Egypt. She has directed more than 20 documentary films in her career.

Life and career 
Tahani Rached was born on May 16, 1947 in Cairo, Egypt. In 1966, she moved to Montreal to pursue painting. She was a student at the École des beaux-arts de Montréal where she studied painting for two years. She became more involved with the community and thus, turned to filmmaking.

She was hired as a staff filmmaker by Canada's National Film Board in 1981. Rached however, left the Film Board in 2004 to return to Egypt to make films.

Selected filmography 
 Pour faire changement (To Make a Change) - 1973
 Where Dollars Grow on Trees (Les voleurs de job) - 1980
 La phonie furieuse - 1982
 Beyrouth! Not Enough Death to Go Round - 1983 
 Haïti (Québec) - 1985
 Bam Pay A! Rends-moi mon pays - 1986
 Haïti, Nous là! Nou la! - 1987
 Au chic resto pop - 1990
 Doctors with Heart - 1993
 Emergency! A Critical Situation - 1999
 Four Women of Egypt - 1997
 For a Song - 2001
 Soraida, a Woman of Palestine - 2004
 These Girls - 2005
 Neighbors - 2007

References

External links
Tahani Rached at the National Film Board of Canada
Tahani Rached at Canadian Women Film Directors Database

1947 births
Living people
Canadian women film directors
Canadian documentary film directors
Egyptian women film directors
École des beaux-arts de Montréal alumni
National Film Board of Canada people
Egyptian Canadian
Canadian women documentary filmmakers